Siemowit of Cieszyn ( – 25 September 1391) was a Polish prince, member of the Piast dynasty in the Cieszyn branch.

He was the fifth son of Casimir I, Duke of Cieszyn, by his wife Euphemia, daughter of Duke Trojden I of Czersk-Warsaw.

Life
Like most of Casimir I's children, Siemowit was destined to the cleric since his early years, together with two of his sisters (Jolanta Helena and Elisabeth), and two of his brothers (Bolesław and Jan). The main reason for why Casimir I put three of his five sons to follow a church career was to prevent further division of the already small Duchy of Cieszyn between them after his death. In addition, the Duke of Cieszyn, as a loyal vassal of the Bohemian Kings, hoped to obtain the help of them in obtaining high ecclesiastical dignities for his sons.

As a Teutonic Knight, Siemowit was successively named komturem of Oleśnica Mała near Oława since 1360, Prior of Poland, Bohemia, Moravia, Austria, Styria and Carinthia since 1372 and Governor and Treasurer of the Order in Germany since 1384.

Siemowit's place of burial is unknown.

Ancestry

References
This article was translated from the original in the Polish Wikipedia.

Genealogical database by Herbert Stoyan

Genealogy of the Dukes of Cieszyn

1340s births
1391 deaths
Piast dynasty
Knights of Malta